The Staatsmijn Wilhelmina was the first and the smallest of the Dutch state owned mines. It produced coal for domestic use, as its near neighbours, the Laura Mine, Oranje Nassau II, Willem-Sophia, and Domaniale Mijn.

The concession of the mine was bordered by the privately owned mines mentioned above. After a few decades the mine could not be extended sideways, so the only way to keep production up was going deeper, this in contrast to the large Emma, Hendrik and Maurits mines.

External links
 http://citg.tudelft.nl/?id=18387 Coal Mining in the Netherlands (Delft University of Technology)

Coal mines in the Netherlands
Buildings and structures in Kerkrade